Abel Rodríguez Ramírez (1 January 1971 – 15 October 2021) was a Cuban actor. He was married to the Colombian actress Anna Lopez with whom he has a son named Benjamin.

Television role 
 2015 Celia ... Eliecer Calvo
 2010 El Clon ... Enrique
 2009 Verano en Venecia ... Miguel Tirado
 2008 Tiempo final ... Castro
 2006 Por Amor ... Jose Angel Rivero del Castillo
 2005 Corazón delator (short)
 2005 Viva Cuba ... Malú's father
 2005 Bailando chachacha
 2004 Pasaje de ida (short)
 2004 La viuda de la mafia ... Camilio Pulido
 2002 Rosa la china ... Marco
 2002 Scent of Oak ... José Álvarez

References

External links
 

1971 births
2021 deaths
21st-century Cuban male actors
Cuban emigrants to Colombia
Colombian male telenovela actors
Colombian male television actors
21st-century Colombian male actors
Place of birth missing